Richard Quincy Yardley (March 11, 1903 – November 24, 1979) was an editorial cartoonist for The Baltimore Sun, Maryland, United States. He joined the Sun in 1923, later replacing Edmund Duffy who left to take a cartoonist position at The Saturday Evening Post. Yardley became known for his distinctive blend of unusual cartooning styles, with Duffy later describing Yardley's work as "truly original."

References

1903 births
1979 deaths
American editorial cartoonists
The Baltimore Sun people
Artists from Baltimore